Unthank is the name of two farms, Wester Unthank and Easter Unthank, in Moray, Scotland. The settlement was the site of a chapel dedicated to the Virgin Mary, founded before 1222 and connected with Duffus Castle.

References

Farms in Scotland
Moray